Wrangeliaceae is a red alga family in the order Ceramiales. It was published by J.Agardh in 1851 (originally as 'Wrangelieae') in his book Species, genera et ordines algarum : seu descriptiones succinctae specierum.

Genera
As accepted by Algaebase; (with approx. no of species per genera)

Subfamilia Compsothamnioideae De Toni (21)
Tribus Compsothamnieae F.Schmitz & Hauptfleisch (17)
Antarcticothamnion R.L.Moe & P.C.Silva (1)
Compsothamnion (Nägeli) F.Schmitz (4)
Dasythamniella P.C.Silva (5)
Gymnophycus Huisman & Kraft (3)
Mortensenia Weber Bosse (1)
Rhododictyon W.R.Taylor (1)
Scagelonema R.E.Norris & M.J.Wynne (1)
Spencerella Darbishire (1)

Lasiothalieae H.B.S.Womersley (1)
Lasiothalia Harvey (1)
Radiathamnieae Gordon-Mills & Kraft (3)
Laurenciophila Stegenga (1)
Ochmapexus Womersley (1)
Subfamilia Spongoclonioideae De Toni (42)
Spongoclonieae F.Schmitz & Hauptfleisch (42)
Lophothamnion J.Agardh (1)
Pleonosporium Nägeli (31)
Spongoclonium Sonder (10)
Tribus Dasyphileae F.Schmitz & Hauptfleisch (5)
 Dasyphila Sonder (4)
 Muellerena F.Schmitz (1)
Tribus Griffithsieae Schmitz & Hauptfleisch (64)
 Anotrichium Nägeli (14)     
 Baldockia A.J.K.Millar (1)    
 Bornetia Thuret (5)  
 Griffithsia C.Agardh (42)  
 Halurus Kützing (2)
 Vickersia Karsakoff (1)  
 Tribus Halosieae M.Cormaci & G.Furnari (1)
 Halosia Cormaci & G.Furnari (1)   
Tribus Lejolisieae Feldmann-Mazoyer (20)
 Lejolisia Bornet (7) 
 Ptilothamnion Thuret (13) 
Tribus Monosporeae F.Schmitz & Hauptfleisch (17)
Anisoschizus Huisman & Kraft (1)
Desikacharyella B.Subramanian (2)
Deucalion Huisman & Kraft (1) 
Guiryella Huisman & Kraft (1)  
Mazoyerella Gordon-Mills & Womersley (4)   
Monosporus Solier (5)
Tanakaella Itono (3)   
Tribus Ptiloteae F.Schmitz & Hauptfleisch (25)
Boreothamnion M.J.Wynne (1)
Dasyptilon G.Feldmann (3)  
Plumaria F.Schmitz (1)
Plumariopsis De Toni (2)
Ptilota C.Agardh (14)
Tokidaea Yoshida (4)
Tribus Spermothamnieae F.Schmitz & Hauptfleisch (38)
 Gordoniella Itono (1)    
 Hommersandiella Alongi, Cormaci & G.Furnari (1)
 Interthamnion E.M.Gordon (1) 
 Lomathamnion E.M.Gordon (1)  
 Ptilothamnionopsis P.S.Dixon (1)
 Rhipidothamnion Huisman (1) 
 Spermothamnion Areschoug (17) 
 Stegengaea Alongi, Cormaci & G.Furnari (1)  
 Tiffaniella Doty & Meñez (12)  
 Woelkerlingia Alongi, Cormaci & G.Furnari (2)  
Tribus Sphondylothamnieae Feldmann-Mazoyer (22)
 Diplothamnion A.B.Joly & Yamaguishi (3)
 Grallatoria M.Howe (2)     
 Involucrana Baldock & Womersley (2)     
 Medeiothamnion Pujals (6)
 Shepleya E.M.Gordon (5)   
 Sphondylothamnion Nägeli (1)   
 Wollastoniella E.M.Gordon (2)    

 
Tribus Wrangelieae Schmitz & Hauptfleisch (27) 
 Plumariella Okamura (2)    
 Wrangelia'' C.Agardh  (25)

References

External links 

Red algae families
Ceramiales